Jatropha macrantha, also called the huanarpo macho, is a medium size shrubby tree species in the genus Jatropha with orange red flowers. It is  indigenous to Peru. It is as popular in Peru as Muira Puama is in Brazil.

Catechin,  catechin-7-O-β-glucopyranoside and procyanidin B3 can be found in Huanarpo Macho.

References

External links 

 rainforest-database.com

macrantha
Flora of Peru
Plants described in 1865